Tianzhen railway station  is a station on the Beijing–Baotou railway and the Datong–Zhangjiakou high-speed railway in Tianzhen County, Datong, Shanxi.

Railway stations in Shanxi